INS Khanderi may refer to:

 , Indian Navy submarine in service 1968–1989
 , Indian Navy submarine commissioned in 2019

Indian Navy ship names